The Dictionary of Medieval Latin from British Sources ("DMLBS") is a lexicon of Medieval Latin published by the British Academy. The dictionary is not founded upon any earlier dictionary, but derives from original research. After decades of preparatory work, work on the dictionary itself was begun in 1965, and it was published in fascicules between 1975 and 2013.  In 2016 the complete work was put online. A consolidated reprint in three volumes was published in 2018.

History

In 1913, Robert Whitwell, a prolific contributor to the Oxford English Dictionary, petitioned the British Academy to use the imminent International Congress of Historical Studies to propose a replacement for the standard dictionary of medieval Latin, Du Cange's Glossarium (1678). Whitwell's idea was taken up in 1920 by the new International Union of Academies, which decided in 1924 that member academies should produce dictionaries based on those medieval Latin texts produced in geographic areas corresponding to their respective present-day territories, whilst also furnishing the material for an international Novum Glossarium. To this end, the British Academy appointed two committees to direct the collection of quotations, one covering the sixth to eleventh centuries for the Novum Glossarium and the other covering 1066 to 1600 for a dictionary of "late medieval British Latin".

By 1932 the Academy felt that they could usefully publish the first fruits of the project, which appeared in 1934 as the Medieval Latin Word-List from British and Irish Sources, prepared by J. H. Baxter and Charles Johnson. A Revised Word-List prepared by Ronald Latham appeared in 1965.

Print publication history
The DMLBS was published in printed fascicules, from 1975 to 2013, by Oxford University Press:

 I: A–B (R. E. Latham), 17 April 1975, 
 II: C (R. E. Latham), 14 May 1981, 
 III: D–E (R. E. Latham, D. R. Howlett, et al.), 26 June 1986, 
 IV: F–G–H (D. R. Howlett, A. H. Powell, et al.), 14 December 1989, 
 V: I–J–K–L (D. R. Howlett), 21 August 1997, 
 VI: M (D. R. Howlett, J. Blundell, et al.), 3 January 2002, 
 VII: N (D. R. Howlett), 30 May 2002, 
 VIII: O (D. R. Howlett), 29 January 2004, 
 IX: P–Pel (D. R. Howlett), 24 November 2005, 
 X: Pel–Phi (D. R. Howlett), 18 January 2007, 
 XI: Phi–Pos (D. R. Howlett), 13 December 2007, 
 XII: Pos–Pro (D. R. Howlett), 26 March 2009, 
 XIII: Pro–Reg (D. R. Howlett), 28 October 2010, 
 XIV: Reg–Sal (D. R. Howlett), 8 December 2011, 
 XV: Sal–Sol (D. R. Howlett, R. K. Ashdowne), 26 July 2012, 
 XVI: Sol–Syr (R. K. Ashdowne, D. R. Howlett), 19 February 2013, 
 XVII: Syr–Z (R. K. Ashdowne), 19 December 2013, 

A binding case for the first five fascicules was supplied with Fascicule V, forming a first volume (A–L).  However, no further binding cases were issued.

In 2018 a three-volume consolidated edition was published incorporating additions and corrections, including those previously published, into the text.

Publication online

In 2016 the whole DMLBS was published online, under licence from the British Academy.  The Logeion version is free and is searchable by headword only.  The Brepols version, available by subscription, is more fully searchable.

See also
A Latin Dictionary
Oxford Latin Dictionary
Lexicon Mediae et Infimae Latinitatis Polonorum

References

Further reading

External links
 Logeion has a complete, free copy of Dictionary of Medieval Latin from British Sources ("DMLBS"), searchable by headword.
 Dictionary of Medieval Latin from British Sources project website
 Dictionary of Medieval Latin from British Sources project blog
 Quisquiliae, notes from an Assistant Editor on the Dictionary of Medieval Latin from British Sources

1975 non-fiction books
Oxford dictionaries
Latin dictionaries
Works about the Middle Ages
Research projects
British Academy
20th-century Latin books